Youth justice may refer to:

Youth Justice (journal)
Youth justice in England and Wales
Youth justice in New Zealand

See also
Age of criminal responsibility
Juvenile justice (disambiguation)
Minor (law)
Youth detention center